Vincent High School may refer to any of several institutions, including:
Harold S. Vincent High School
Chester County Training School (whose name was changed to Vincent High School in 1963)
Strong Vincent High School

See also 
St. Vincent's High School